PEI Architects, formerly Pei Partnership Architects, is an international architecture firm based in New York City. Co-founded by the sons of I. M. Pei, Chien Chung (Didi) Pei and Li Chung (Sandi) Pei, in 1992, PEI Architects has specialized in high-profile projects including museums, healthcare facilities, commercial buildings, and high-rise residential towers, as well as urban masterplans and waterfront parks, in North America, Asia, Europe, Africa, and the Middle East. Major projects have included the Chinese Embassy in Washington, D.C., the Bank of China Head Office in Beijing, the Suzhou Museum, the Centurion luxury condominium in New York City, and many others.

Background 
Didi and Sandi Pei founded Pei Partnership Architects (PPA) in 1992, after working for their father's firm. Both brothers earned master's degrees in architecture from the Harvard University Graduate School of Design, and gained experience in large-scale building design projects at I. M. Pei & Partners, which became Pei Cobb Freed & Partners after their father retired in 1990. I. M. Pei worked as a consultant for his sons' business into his nineties, before his death in 2019 at age 102.  

In 2010, World Policy Journal stated that "Didi and his brother are placing their stamp on many of China's greatest cities – from Macau and Hong Kong to Shanghai, Shenzhen and Beijing." According to I. M. Pei, Pei Partnership Architects "came of age" with the Bank of China (BOC) Beijing headquarters project. The PPA's Bank of China Head Office project was the most recent milestone in the Pei family's long association with the BOC, starting with grandfather Tsuyee Pei, who served as a director of the bank, and I. M. Pei, who designed the Bank of China Tower in Hong Kong. 

The firm's philosophy is to understand the local context for each project, which has led to design choices such as using white cantera, a local limestone, for the exterior of the Guanajuato State Library in León, Mexico.

Notable projects 
The two brothers collaborated on designing the new chancery building for the Embassy of the People's Republic of China in Washington, D.C. According to C. C. Pei, the firm received about $4 million for its work in overseeing the design of the Chinese Embassy. Other major collaborative projects, also involving their father, included the design of the Bank of China Head Office building in Beijing; the Macau Science Center; and the Suzhou Museum. In designing the Suzhou Museum, both Chien Chung and Li Chung Pei were closely involved with their father in selecting every rock and tree used in the gardens. While I. M. Pei designed the Museum of Islamic Art in Doha, Qatar, Pei Partnership Architects worked with Qatar Museums Authority (QMA) landscape architects on the adjacent  Museum of Islamic Art Park.

Projects led by Didi Pei for Pei Partnership Architects have included the Ronald Reagan UCLA Medical Center, which was done in collaboration with Perkins+Will. He also led the design of the United States National Slavery Museum in Fredericksburg, Virginia, after the firm was appointed by the former governor of Virginia, Douglas Wilder; as of  the museum remains unbuilt. Since founding PPA, Sandi Pei led projects including the Industrial and Commercial Bank of China headquarters in Beijing, and The Centurion, the firm's first ground-up building in New York City.

PEI Architects has also undertaken large-scale urban development projects in the U.S., Mexico, China, Indonesia, and Singapore. In 2009, Pei Partnership Architects received the AIA/ALA Library Building Award for its design of the Guanajuato State Library in Léon, Mexico, the first of several new cultural buildings that were part of the Centro Cultural Guanajuato masterplan prepared by the firm.

Unique eco-conscious projects undertaken by Pei Partnership Architects have included the Beijing Xingdebao BMW 5S dealership, designed to consume 30 percent less energy than other buildings of its size, using gardens with wind turbines, solar and photovoltaic panels, and geothermal energy systems.

List of selected projects

Commercial 
 Alturki Business Park, Dhahran, Saudi Arabia
 Amgen Headquarters, Thousand Oaks, California
 Bank of China Head Office, Beijing
 Bank of China Heritage Building, Hong Kong
 Beijing Xingdebao BMW 5S Dealership
 Chateau Lynch-Bages Winery, Pauillac, Bordeaux, France
 Faria Lima B32, São Paulo, Brazil
 Industrial and Commercial Bank of China Headquarters, Beijing
 Q1 Fortune Tower, Qingdao, China
 Shanghai Commercial Bank headquarters, Hong Kong
 Zhengzhou Commodity Exchange, China

Cultural 
 Balai Pameran Islam Sultan Haji Hassanal Bolkiah (BPIS) Museum, Brunei
 China Institute, Upper East Side, Manhattan, New York

 Dongfang City Coast Zone Urban Design International Competition, Hainan, China

 Guanajuato State Library, León, Mexico
 Jianfu Palace Garden, Beijing, China
 Macau Dancing Water Theater, City of Dreams, Macau
 Macau Science Center, Macau
 Museum of Islamic Art Park, Doha, Qatar
 Nanhai Cultural Center International Design Competition, Guangzhou, Foshan City, China
 Six Dynasties Museum, Nanjing, China
Suzhou Museum, Suzhou, China
U.S. National Slavery Museum, Fredericksburg, Virginia, United States (unbuilt)

Health care
 Martha Stewart Center for Living at Mount Sinai, New York, New York
 Ronald Reagan UCLA Medical Center, Los Angeles, California

Residential
 The Centurion, New York City
 West Village Townhouse, New York City

Governmental
 Embassy of People's Republic of China in Washington, D.C.

Notes

References

External links
 
 2022 Tucker Design Awards: Chateau Lynch-Bages New Bordeaux Winery (YouTube)

Architecture firms of the United States
Architecture firms based in New York City
Design companies established in 1992
1992 establishments in New York City
American companies established in 1992